Emily Pia Halliday (born 5 April 1979) is a former Australian field hockey player.

Halliday played as a defender, and competed in the 2004 and 2008 Summer Olympics, in Athens and Beijing, respectively.

Career
In 2001, Halliday made her debut for the Hockeyroos in a test series against Argentina in Rosario. That same year, she medalled with the Australian team twice, winning gold at the Oceania Cup and bronze at the Champions Trophy.

At the 2003 Champions Trophy, Halliday won her first gold medal at a major international tournament.

The most prolific year in Halliday's career was 2006, when she won gold and silver medals at the Commonwealth Games and World Cup respectively.

Halliday retired in 2009 due to medical reasons.

References

External links
 

1979 births
Living people
Australian female field hockey players
Olympic field hockey players of Australia
Field hockey players at the 2004 Summer Olympics
Field hockey players at the 2008 Summer Olympics
Commonwealth Games medallists in field hockey
Commonwealth Games gold medallists for Australia
Field hockey players at the 2006 Commonwealth Games
20th-century Australian women
21st-century Australian women
Medallists at the 2006 Commonwealth Games